is a former baseball player from Japan. He played for the Chiba Lotte Marines, Yakult Swallows, Osaka Kintetsu Buffaloes and many other teams of the Japan Pacific League.

References

1974 births
Living people
Baseball people from Kanagawa Prefecture
Japanese baseball players
Nippon Professional Baseball outfielders
Kintetsu Buffaloes players
Osaka Kintetsu Buffaloes players
Yakult Swallows players
Chiba Lotte Marines players
Japanese baseball coaches
Nippon Professional Baseball coaches